Gwyn ap Nudd (sometimes found with the antiquated spelling Gwynn ap Nudd) is a Welsh mythological figure, the king of the Tylwyth Teg or "fair folk" and ruler of the Welsh Otherworld, Annwn, and whose name means “Gwyn, son of Nudd”. Described later on as a great warrior with a "blackened face", Gwyn is intimately associated with the otherworld in medieval Welsh literature, and is associated with the international tradition of the Wild Hunt.

Family
Gwyn is the son of Nudd and would thus be grandson to Beli Mawr and nephew of Arianrhod, Llefelys, Penarddun, Afallach, Gofannon, Nynniaw, Peibaw, and Caswallawn. Based on their shared patronymic (ap Nudd), his siblings include Edern, a warrior who appears in a number of Arthurian texts, and Owain ap Nudd, who is mentioned briefly in Geraint and Enid. In Culhwch and Olwen, Gwyn is the lover of Creiddylad, the daughter of Lludd, who may therefore be Gwyn's own sister, though that connection was not made by the medieval author(s) of Culhwch and Olwen.

Legends

The abduction of Creiddylad
Gwyn plays a prominent role in the early Arthurian tale Culhwch and Olwen in which he abducts his sister Creiddylad from her betrothed, Gwythyr ap Greidawl. In retaliation, Gwythyr raised a great host against Gwyn, leading to a vicious battle between the two. Gwyn was victorious and, following the conflict, captured a number of Gwythyr's noblemen including Nwython and his son Cyledr. Gwyn would later murder Nwython, and force Cyledr to eat his father's heart. As a result of his torture at Gwyn's hands, Cyledr went mad, earning the epithet Wyllt.

After the intervention of Arthur, Gwyn and Gwythr agreed to fight for Creiddylad every May Day until Judgement Day. The warrior who was victorious on this final day would at last take the maiden. According to Culhwch and Olwen, Gwyn was "placed over the brood of devils in Annwn, lest they should destroy the present race".

As part of Arthur's retinue

Before he can win Olwen's hand, Culhwch ap Cilydd must complete a number of seemingly impossible tasks given to him by Olwen's father, the giant Ysbaddaden. One of these tasks is to retrieve the comb and scissors from the head of the vicious boar, Twrch Trwyth. As it is impossible to hunt the boar without Gwyn's aid, he is called upon to join Arthur and his retinue against Twrch Trwyth. During the hunt, he is mounted on Du y Moroedd, the only horse that can carry him. Both Gwyn and Gwythyr set out with Arthur to retrieve the blood of Orddu, witch of the uplands of hell.

Other exploits
Gwyn appears prominently in the medieval poem The Dialogue of Gwyn ap Nudd and Gwyddno Garanhir, found in the Black Book of Carmarthen. In this narrative—Gwyn, returning from battle, chances upon Gwyddno Garanhir, king of Cantre'r Gwaelod, and grants him his protection. Gwyn then relates his exploits on the battlefield and his role as a psychopomp, a mysterious figure who gathers the souls of fallen British warriors, such as Bran the Blessed, Meurig ap Carreian, Gwendoleu ap Ceidaw and Llacheu ab Arthur. His skill in combat is extolled in this poem; he is described as "the hope of armies" and "hero of hosts" and, when asked from which region he comes, he simply replies: "I come from battle and conflict." The poem ends with Gwyn's proclamation:

His role as a psychopomp is paralleled in his later tradition as leader of the Wild Hunt, in which he leads a pack of supernatural hounds known as the Cŵn Annwn to harvest human souls. In Welsh folklore, to hear the baying of Gwyn's hounds was a portent of imminent death in the family. In The Dialogue, Gwyn is also accompanied by a hound, namely as Dormarth of the ruddy nose.

Gwyn apparently witnessed a "conflict" before Caer Vandwy, an otherworldly fortress mentioned in Preiddeu Annwfn.

Later traditions

Over time, Gwyn's role would diminish and, in later folklore, he was regarded as the king of the Tylwyth Teg, the fairies of Welsh lore. He appears as a simpler figure in Buchedd Collen (The Life of Saint Collen), in which he and his retinue are vanquished from Glastonbury Tor with the use of holy water. According to the Speculum Christiani, a fourteenth century manuscript against divination, Welsh soothsayers would invoke Gwyn's name before entering woodlands, proclaiming: "to the king of Spirits, and to his queen—
Gwyn ap Nudd, 
you who are yonder in the forest, 
for love of your mate, 
permit us to enter your dwelling."

The celebrated fourteenth-century bard Dafydd ap Gwilym refers to Gwyn in a number of texts, suggesting that the character was widely known in Wales during the medieval period. In Y Dylluan, he describes the eponymous owl as the "fowl of Gwyn ap Nudd".  Y Pwll Mawn, in which the bard tells an unfortunate autobiographical account in which he and his horse were almost drowned in a lake, described as the "fish lake of Gwyn ap Nudd" and "the palace of the elves and their children."

Gwyn is often associated with the Wild Hunt, in a role akin to Woden or Herne the Hunter. Some traditions name Gwyn's chief huntsman as Iolo ap Huw, who, every Halloween, "may be found cheering Cŵn Annwn over Cader Idris". In the Black Book of Carmarthen Gwyn states that his finest hound is Dormarch.

Etymology
Gwyn means "fair, bright, white", cognate with the Irish fionn. As such, he has some connection to the Irish hero Fionn mac Cumhail, whose maternal great-grandfather was Nuada. The name of Gwyn's father, Nudd, appears like Nuada to be cognate with the Brythonic deity Nodens.

Gwyn is in everyday use as a common noun and adjective: it also remains a popular personal name. Especially in Old and Middle Welsh, "gwyn" also has the connotations of "pure, sacred, holy".

References

External links
Vindos : etymology and history of Vindos as related to Gwynn ap Nudd and Fionn mac Cumhaill.

Welsh mythology
Fairy royalty
Psychopomps